Georges Charles Paul Cochery (20 March 1855 – 10 August 1914) was the son of the French politician Louis-Adolphe Cochery.

Cochery was deputy of his father's département of the Loiret from 1885 until 1914, five times president of the Budget Commission, minister of finance (1895–1898) and vice-president of the chamber (1898–1902), and again finance minister in the Briand Cabinet, 1909.

References

 

1855 births
1914 deaths
Politicians from Paris
French Ministers of Finance
Members of the 4th Chamber of Deputies of the French Third Republic
Members of the 5th Chamber of Deputies of the French Third Republic
Members of the 6th Chamber of Deputies of the French Third Republic
Members of the 7th Chamber of Deputies of the French Third Republic
Members of the 8th Chamber of Deputies of the French Third Republic
Members of the 9th Chamber of Deputies of the French Third Republic
Members of the 10th Chamber of Deputies of the French Third Republic
Members of the 11th Chamber of Deputies of the French Third Republic